Diana, 7 Days is a 2017 documentary film which was broadcast in the United Kingdom by BBC on 27 August 2017. The documentary is the last of two documentaries commissioned by Prince William and Prince Harry to commemorate the 20th anniversary of the death of their mother, Diana, Princess of Wales.

The film focuses on Diana's death and funeral and the effect it had on those closest to her and to the grieving public.

The documentary drew 5.6 million viewers – making it the most watched television programme that night in the UK.

Cast 
 Prince William, Duke of Cambridge 
 Prince Harry
 Charles Spencer, 9th Earl Spencer
 Lady Sarah McCorquodale
 Tony Blair
 Alastair Campbell
 Richard Ayre
 Jayne Fincher
 Fergus Shanahan
 Malcolm Ross

See also
 Diana, Our Mother: Her Life and Legacy, the first 2017 documentary commissioned by the sons.

References 

Documentary films about British royalty
British documentary films
Films set in the United Kingdom
Films set in the 20th century
2017 television films
2017 films
Films about Diana, Princess of Wales
2010s British films